Revolting Cocks, also known as RevCo, are an American-Belgian industrial rock band, and sometimes supergroup, that began as a musical side project for Richard23 of Front 242, Luc van Acker, and Al Jourgensen of Ministry.

History

1984: Origins 
Revolting Cocks' origins date to late 1984, when Belgian industrial dance group Front 242, after having been invited by Chicago-based indie record label Wax Trax! Records, commenced their first American tour as an opening act for their then-labelmates, American band Ministry. Afterwards, Ministry lead singer Al Jourgensen asked Front 242 member Richard23 to produce a dub remix project. After returning to Brussels, Richard23 discussed collaboration with Luc van Acker; Van Acker, previously session guitarist for Shriekback, joined the newly formed project after talking with Jourgensen over the phone. The band's name came from an incident that took place in a Chicago bar; according to van Acker and Jourgensen, the band was trying out "insulting French expressions" on a waiter, ordering something they said meant "revolting cock" which led the waiter to say, "You are revolting cocks!"

Their first release was "No Devotion" on Wax Trax! Records in 1985. The single was quickly followed by an album, Big Sexy Land (1986), featuring a mix of industrial, hard rock, and EBM with dominating sampling and strong synthesized beats.

1985–1994: Initial run 
Richard23 quit in 1986, after falling out with Jourgensen over his and Adrian Sherwood's remix of the song "You Often Forget". The group's remaining two members were augmented by Chris Connelly (formerly of Finitribe, later of Ministry), Paul Barker and Bill Rieflin (both formerly of The Blackouts and at the time in Ministry), with various others appearing as contributors or guests.

The following live album, Live! You Goddamned Son of a Bitch (1988), recorded at a single September 1987 show in Chicago, featured more aggressive versions of the Big Sexy Land tracks along with some new material. This trend continued on Beers, Steers, and Queers (1990), layering sample over sample and pushing ever further into distortion. The budget for Beers, Steers, and Queers and its accompanying single "(Let's Get) Physical" ballooned to $30,000 in early 1990 primarily due to copyright troubles surrounding the cover of Olivia Newton-John's hit song, and led to a strained relationship between Jourgensen and Wax Trax. As it happened, these would be the last Revolting Cocks releases on Wax Trax as Sire Records bought out the rights to all of Jourgensen's side projects.

Linger Ficken' Good (1993) was released by Sire Records, with most tracks returning to the less layered material. Included was a cover of Rod Stewart's "Da Ya Think I'm Sexy?", also released as a single. A tour was planned but cancelled, and the band went on hiatus.

2004–2010: First revival 
In 2004, Jourgensen, with former RevCo player Phildo Owens (Skatenigs, Snow Black), revived the group, and previewed a new song, "Prune Tang". An album titled Purple Head was due in 2004, but was delayed until 2006 with a change in title to Cocked and Loaded. "Caliente (Dark Entries)", a cover of "Dark Entries" by Bauhaus, with vocalist Gibby Haynes (Butthole Surfers), was featured on the soundtrack to Saw II in 2005.

After assembling a touring line up to open for Ministry on the MasterBaTour of 2006, Jourgensen chose vocalist Josh Bradford (Stayte, Simple Shelter, V.H.S.), keyboardist Clayton Worbeck (Stayte, Simple Shelter), and guitarist Sin Quirin (Society 1, later Ministry and ReVamp) as the new full-time members for the Revolting Cocks, now simply being called "RevCo". The group recorded Sex-O Olympic-O, which was originally set to be released in October 2008, but was delayed multiple times until it saw release on March 3, 2009. Following a tour, a second album with this lineup, ¿Got Cock?, was released on April 13, 2010. The project fell apart once again with Bradford and Worbeck parting ways. Quirin continued to work with Jourgensen following Ministry's revival in 2011.

2010s: Second revival  
In celebration of the record label, a "Wax Trax! Records Retrospectacle:  Year Anniversary" concert series was held from April 15 to 17, 2011 at Metro Chicago in Chicago, Illinois. As a part of the lineup, Chris Connelly, Paul Barker, and Luc van Acker performed Revolting Cocks songs with Duane Buford, Dan Brill, Jamie Duffy and others. For their performance on the 17th, Richard 23 joined them on stage to sing "No Devotion".

In 2016, Richard 23, van Acker, Barker, and Connelly performed under the shorter name The Cocks for a six-date tour to mark the 30th anniversary of Big Sexy Land, accompanied by Dan Brill and Jason Novak. A larger tour followed in 2017, with the band using the original Revolting Cocks name. The band played a series of gigs in Europe, including the WGT and Infest festivals, before returning to the US for a tour with Front Line Assembly.

On April 8, 2018, Jourgensen announced that another album was in the process of being recorded.

Members

Current members
 Richard23 – vocals (1985–1986, 2011 [guest appearance], 2016–present), percussion (1985-1986)
 Luc van Acker – vocals (1985–1991, 2006, 2011, 2013, 2016–present), guitars (1985-1988)
 Paul Barker – bass (1987–1993, 2011, 2013, 2016–present), production (1987-1993)
 Chris Connelly – vocals (1987–1993, 2011, 2013, 2016–present)

Former members
 Al Jourgensen – production, guitar (1985–1993, 2004–2010)
 Bill Rieflin – drums (1986–1993) (died 2020)
 Phildo Owen – vocals (1989–1991, 2004–2006)
 Duane Buford – keyboards (1993, 2011, 2013)
 Mike Scaccia – guitar (1993, 2004–2006) (died 2012)
 Josh Bradford – vocals (2006–2010)
 Sin Quirin – guitars, bass, keyboards (2006–2010)
 Clayton Worbeck – keyboards, bass (2006–2010)

Touring members
 Nivek Ogre – vocals (1988)
 Michael Balch – keyboards (1990–1991)
 Mark Durante – guitar, backing vocals (1990–1991)
 Trent Reznor – vocals (1990)
 Jeff Ward – drums (1990) (died 1993)
 Anna K – bass (2006)
 Seven Antonopoulos – drums (2006)
 Murv Douglas – bass (2009)
 Aaron Rossi – drums (2009)
 Jamie Duffy – guitar (2011) (died 2012)
 Dan Brill – drums (2011, 2013, 2016–present)
 Jason Novak – samples, percussion, guitar (2016–present)

Timeline

Discography

Studio albums
Big Sexy Land (1986)
Beers, Steers, and Queers (1990)
Linger Ficken' Good (1993)
Cocked and Loaded (2006)
Sex-O Olympic-O (2009)
¿Got Cock? (2010)

Live albums
Live! You Goddamned Son of a Bitch (1988)

Remix albums
Cocktail Mixxx (2007)
Sex-O MiXXX-O (2009)
¿Got Mixxx? (2011)

Singles
"No Devotion" (1985)
"You Often Forget" (1986) (UK Indie #13)
"Stainless Steel Providers" (1989)
"(Let's Get) Physical" (1989)
"Beers, Steers, and Queers" (The Remixes) (1991)
"Da Ya Think I'm Sexy?" (1993)
"Crackin' Up" (1994)

Notes

References

Further reading

 
 
 

Musical groups established in 1985
Sire Records artists
Wax Trax! Records artists
American industrial metal musical groups
Musical groups disestablished in 1993
Musical groups reestablished in 2004
Musical groups disestablished in 2010
Heavy metal supergroups
Warner Records artists